Santiago Aloi (born 25 March 1987) is an Argentine footballer who plays as a midfielder or forward for German Oberliga Niedersachsen club TuS Bersenbrück.

Beginning his career in his native Argentina with River Plate, Aloi spent the 2007–08 season on loan with Watford in the Football League Championship. He later returned to South America, playing in his homeland as well as  representing Municipal Liberia in the Costa Rican Primera División. In 2014, he returned to England with Kidderminster Harriers and spent a month on loan at Worcester City.

Career
Aloi was spotted by Watford scouts in May 2007 and was signed on loan on 31 August 2007 with a view to a permanent deal. However, he never appeared for the first team and did not join permanently. He made just one substitute appearance in the Primera B Nacional for Belgrano before heading to Costa Rica, where he appeared twice in the Primera División for Municipal Liberia. He went on trial with Scottish side Falkirk in 2011.

In 2012 Aloi returned to Argentina with hometown club Alumni in the third division of Argentine football. He played 14 times, scoring 2 goals. His good form attracted the attention of Milton Keynes Dons manager Karl Robinson who offered Aloi a trial at the club in the summer of 2013. No permanent deal materialised and after another year with Alumni playing four more times, Aloi returned to the United Kingdom with Conference Premier side Kidderminster Harriers in January 2014. In March, he signed a month-long loan deal with Worcester City where he played 6 times.

He returned to his homeland to play for Club Atlético Mitre in July 2014.

References

External links 
 
 Santiago Aloi at FuPa

1987 births
Living people
Argentine expatriate footballers
Argentine footballers
Association football midfielders
People from Villa María
Alumni de Villa María players
Watford F.C. players
Kidderminster Harriers F.C. players
Worcester City F.C. players
Club Atlético River Plate footballers
Club Atlético Belgrano footballers
Municipal Liberia footballers
Club Atlético Mitre footballers
Instituto footballers
Chemnitzer FC players
BSV Schwarz-Weiß Rehden players
Primera Nacional players
Torneo Federal A players
Liga FPD players
Regionalliga players
Oberliga (football) players
Argentine expatriate sportspeople in Costa Rica
Argentine expatriate sportspeople in England
Argentine expatriate sportspeople in Germany
Expatriate footballers in Costa Rica
Expatriate footballers in England
Expatriate footballers in Germany
Sportspeople from Córdoba Province, Argentina